Winslow High School is a high school in Winslow, Arizona. It is the only high school under the jurisdiction of the Winslow Unified School District, which also includes Jefferson Elementary, Washington Elementary, Bonnie Brennan Elementary and Winslow Junior High School.

The district (which is the high school's attendance boundary) includes Winslow, Winslow West, and a portion of Seba Dalkai.

Athletics
Winslow High School is a member of the Arizona Interscholastic Association 3A Conference. (The school has been in 3A for most of its existence, except for a time in the late 1960s through the early 1980s.) Winslow has won 31 state championships.

References

Public high schools in Arizona
Schools in Navajo County, Arizona
Winslow, Arizona